Action sociale CHECHE, is a work training center located in Bukavu, Democratic Republic of Congo, founded by a Jesuit priest in 1963. It seeks to prepare for a useful trade youth who have left school or find themselves unemployed. It is a project of the Central African Province of the Society of Jesus.

Origin 
CHECHE ("SPARK") was launched in 1963 by Fr. Cronenberghs. Initially, he was tasked with looking for ways to give work to idle youth, who had failed to complete secondary school and who had not found employment. He offered workshops and courses in carpentry, mechanics, and construction, preparing highly qualified workers. Six other Jesuits joined Cronenberghs who remained with the program over 50 years.

Current 
CHECHE has been listed second among the top schools in Bukavu.

See also
 List of Jesuit sites

References  

Jesuit development centres
Organizations established in 1963
Poverty-related organizations
1963 establishments in the Republic of the Congo (Léopoldville)